Hüttner or Huttner is a surname, and may refer to:

Csaba Hüttner (born 1971), Hungarian sprint canoer 
Hans Hüttner (1885–1956), Wehrmacht officer
Jan Lisa Huttner (born 1951), American film critic
Michael Huttner (born 1969), American attorney
Peter Hüttner (born 1945), Swedish actor
Per Hüttner, Swedish artist